Don't Say You Love Me may refer to:
"Don't Say You Love Me" (M2M song), 1999
"Don't Say You Love Me" (Erasure song), 2005
"Don't Say You Love Me" (Fifth Harmony song), 2018
"Don't Say You Love Me" (The Corrs song), a 1997 song by the Corrs from Talk on Corners
"Don't Say You Love Me" (Free song), a 1970 song by Free from Fire and Water
"Don't Say You Love Me" (Billy Squier song), a 1989 song by Billy Squier from Hear & Now

See also
"Don't Tell Me You Love Me"